William Robin Kilpatrick is a Scottish retired amateur football outside left who played in the Scottish League for Queen's Park and Partick Thistle. He was capped by Scotland at amateur level.

References 

Scottish footballers
Scottish Football League players
Queen's Park F.C. players
Association football wing halves
Scotland amateur international footballers
Year of birth missing
Place of birth missing